Nebraska Highway 103 is a highway in southeastern Nebraska.  It is a discontinuous highway with two segments.  The southern segment begins at Nebraska Highway 8 south of Diller and ends at U.S. Highway 136 north of Diller.  The northern segment begins at Nebraska Highway 4 east of Plymouth and ends at Interstate 80 north of Pleasant Dale.

Route description

Southern segment
The southern branch of Nebraska Highway 103 begins at an intersection with NE 8 south of Diller. It heads directly northward through farmland, passing through Diller along the way.

Northern segment
The northern segment of Nebraska Highway 103 begins at NE 4, east of Plymouth. It heads in a northerly direction through farmland, turning briefly to the northwest as it passes through De Witt. After leaving De Witt, NE 103 continues heading northward. In Wilber, it intersects with NE 41. The highway continues heading north and slightly to the northwest until it meets NE 33 in Crete. Just to the northeast of Crete, NE 103 splits off and continues northward. After passing through Pleasant Dale, it intersects with US 6. Less than a mile later, NE 103 intersects with I-80 where it then terminates.

History

Southern segment
The southern segment of N-103 largely follows today's alignment.  However, according to the 1937 state highway map, its southern terminus was Diller.  Between 1937 and 1940, N-103 was extended further south and terminated at N-3S (the current terminus), or present day N-8.

Northern segment
  The northern segment was first numbered N-82 as early as 1937.  The renumbering of N-82 to N-103 occurred somewhere between 1962 and 1981.  Also during this timeframe, N-103 was rerouted to the west and extended north through Crete, Pleasant Dale and terminated at a newly constructed interchange with I-80.  Originally gravel before and around 1981, the section between Crete and Pleasant Dale has since been paved.

Major intersections

References

External links

Nebraska Roads: NE 101-119

103
Transportation in Jefferson County, Nebraska
Transportation in Gage County, Nebraska
Transportation in Saline County, Nebraska
Transportation in Seward County, Nebraska